As-Sahab Media (Arabic: السحاب, "The Cloud") is the official media wing of Al-Qaeda’s core leadership based in Pakistan and Afghanistan. It produces media featuring original sermons and speeches by senior Al-Qaeda commanders as well as footage of international operations carried out by Al-Qaeda. In addition to being released in Arabic, some published videos come with English subtitles.

As-Sahab produces "documentary-quality" videos and its first production under the name is believed to have been in 2001 with the involvement of Adam Yahiye Gadahn.

Regional subchannels
As-Sahab's subchannels are divided into their respective geographical regions and prominent Al-Qaeda groups of the regions, these channels feature region specific footage and feature speeches from their own individual leaders.

Az-Zallaqa Media, Nusrat al-Islam in West Africa

Al-Andalus Media, Al-Qaeda in the Islamic Maghreb

Al-Malahem Media, Al-Qaeda in the Arabian Peninsula

Al-Kataib Media, Al-Shabaab in East Africa

Production
The organization uses modern technology to produce its videos. The release of the "5 Years After Tribute [Manhattan Raid]" video demonstrated a new standard comparing favorably with the production quality obtained by major television networks. Video and audio are (depending on the source material, some of which is dated) usually crisp, and subtitles are by and large free of grammatical and spelling errors and sometimes even explain Islam-specific concepts.

In 2005 a CBC program was released, called, Media Jihad - As-Sahab Foundation, which traces the origins of As-Sahab.

Method of delivery
Previously, Al-Qaeda was known to deliver its videos and audio via a dead drop method using couriers carrying disks or drives. However, the method of delivery was changed in January 2006 after an airstrike on an Al-Qaeda meeting near Damadola, Pakistan. As-Sahab now releases its media on the web.

Filmography
Knowledge Is for Acting Upon: The Manhattan Raid (2006); a 97 minute video describing the motivations of the September 11 attacks
America Burns (2021); a 14 minute video about American decline

See also
Videos of Osama bin Laden
Videos of Ayman al-Zawahiri

References

External links
As-Sahab Foundation for Islamic Media Publication at IMDb
Islamic discussion on As-Sahab Media

Al-Qaeda propaganda
2001 establishments in Afghanistan
2001 establishments in Pakistan
Pakistani companies established in 2001
Mass media companies of Afghanistan
Mass media companies of Pakistan
Afghan websites
Pakistani websites
Publishing companies of Pakistan
Arabic-language websites
English-language websites